Ali Chak is a village in Jalandhar. Jalandhar is a district of Indian state of Punjab. Ali Chak is in India dist Jalandhar, karputhala.

Post code 
Ali Chak's Post office is Kohala whose post code is 144002.

References 

   A Punjabi site with Ali Chak's details

Villages in Jalandhar district